This is a list of animated television series first aired in 1998.

Anime television series first aired in 1998

See also
 List of animated feature films of 1998
 List of Japanese animation television series of 1998

References

Television series
Animated series
1998
1998
1998-related lists